Platymantis corrugatus (Philippine wrinkled ground frog or rough-back forest frog) is a species of frog in the family Ceratobatrachidae. It is endemic to the Philippines, where it is found throughout the archipelago except Palawan. Its natural habitats are tropical moist lowland forest and subtropical or tropical moist montane forest. It is threatened by habitat loss. Platymantis corrugatus is one of the most common Platymantis species in the Philippines.

Range
Platymantis corrugatus is known from Luzon, Mindoro, Leyte, Samar, Siquijor, Bohol, Cebu, Negros, Panay, and Mindanao islands.

References

Platymantis
Amphibians of the Philippines
Endemic fauna of the Philippines
Taxonomy articles created by Polbot
Amphibians described in 1853
Taxa named by André Marie Constant Duméril